The following is a list of notable deaths in June 2017.

Entries for each day are listed alphabetically by surname. A typical entry lists information in the following sequence:
 Name, age, country of citizenship at birth, subsequent country of citizenship (if applicable), what subject was noted for, cause of death (if known), and reference.

June 2017

1
Ernie Ackerley, 73, British footballer (South Melbourne FC).
Roy Barraclough, 81, British comedian (Cissie and Ada) and actor (Coronation Street) respiratory problems.
Donald Caird, 91, Irish Anglican prelate, Archbishop of Dublin (1985–1996).
J. B. Dauda, 74, Sierra Leonean politician, MP for Kenema (1986–1992), Second Vice-President (1991–1992), and Minister of Foreign Affairs (2010–2012).
Roberto De Vicenzo, 94, Argentine golfer, Open champion (1967).
Tankred Dorst, 91, German playwright.
Ludvig Hope Faye, 86, Norwegian politician.
Viviane Gauthier, 99, Haitian dancer.
José Greci, 76, Italian actress (Ben-Hur, The Ten Gladiators, The Sicilian Connection).
Sir Owen Green, 92, British chief executive (BTR plc).
George Joseph, 66, Indian diplomat, Ambassador to Turkmenistan (1997–2001), Qatar (2005–2009) and Bahrain (2009–2010), kidney disease.
Jack McCloskey, 91, American basketball coach (Penn Quakers, Portland Trail Blazers) and executive (Detroit Pistons), complications from Alzheimer's disease.
Alois Mock, 82, Austrian politician, Vice-Chancellor (1987–1989) and Foreign Minister (1987–1995), complications from Parkinson's disease.
Charles Simmons, 92, American author.
Sonja Sutter, 86, German actress (Derrick).
Rosa Taikon, 90, Swedish silversmith and Romani people activist.
Raino Westerholm, 97, Finnish politician.

2
Avie Bennett, 89, Canadian executive, Chancellor of York University (1998–2004).
Gordon Christian, 89, American ice hockey player, Olympic silver medalist (1956).
Walter Eggert, 76, German Olympic luger (1964).
Iakovos Garmatis, 89, Greek-born American Orthodox hierarch, Metropolitan of Chicago (since 1997), complications from surgery.
Ellen José, 66, Australian artist and photographer.
Oskar Kaibyshev, 78, Russian scientist.
Jaroslav Kořán, 77, Czech translator, writer and politician, Charter 77 signatory, Mayor of Prague (1990–1991).
Leon Lemmens, 63, Belgian Roman Catholic prelate, Auxiliary Bishop of Mechelen-Brussels (since 2011), leukemia.
Malcolm Lipkin, 85, English composer.
Pierrino Mascarino, 77, Italian actor (Uncle Nino, Aaron's Way, Tears of the Sun).
David Mattingley, 94, Australian WWII bomber pilot.
Jack O'Neill, 94, American businessman (O'Neill).
Barrie Pettman, 73, British author, publisher and philanthropist.
Sharifuddin Pirzada, 93, Pakistani lawyer and politician, Minister of Foreign Affairs (1966–1968) and Attorney-General (1968–1971, 1977–1984).
S. Abdul Rahman, 79, Indian poet, urinary infection.
Peter Sallis, 96, English actor (Last of the Summer Wine, Wallace and Gromit, The Wind in the Willows).
Herm Starrette, 80, American baseball player (Baltimore Orioles).
Sir Jeffrey Tate, 74, British conductor, heart attack.
Tom Tjaarda, 82, American automobile designer.
Sergei Vikharev, 55, Russian ballet dancer, blood clot.
Ralph Wetton, 89, English footballer (Tottenham Hotspur, Plymouth Argyle).
Stephen Williams, 90, American archaeologist.
Aamir Zaki, 49, Pakistani guitarist, heart failure.

3
Clifford Blackburn, 89, Canadian Olympic boxer.
David Choby, 70, American Roman Catholic prelate, Bishop of Nashville (since 2005), complications from a fall.
Ignacio Echeverría, 39, Spanish banker, stabbed.
Sara Ehrman, 98, American political lobbyist and Jewish activist, endocarditis.
Stefan Gryff, 79, Polish-born Australian actor (Julia, Surviving Picasso, The Saint).
James E. Martin, 84, American educator, president of the University of Arkansas (1980–1984) and Auburn University (1984–1992).
Niels Helveg Petersen, 78, Danish politician, Minister of Foreign Affairs (1993–2000), MP (1966–1974, 1977–1993, 1994–2011), esophageal cancer.
Jimmy Piersall, 87, American baseball player (Boston Red Sox, Cleveland Indians) and broadcaster.
Rehman Rashid, 62, Malaysian journalist (New Straits Times, Asiaweek).
Shivraj, 97, Indian actor (Patita, Seema, Miss Mary).
Eleanor Singer, 87, Austrian-born American expert on survey methodology.
Vincent Tshabalala, 75, South African golfer.
John K. Watts, 80, Australian football player (East Perth) and broadcaster.
Lawrence Weed, 93, American medical researcher.

4
Esmé Berman, 88, South African art historian, Parkinson's disease.
Bill Butler, 83, British film editor (A Clockwork Orange, A Touch of Class).
Danny Dias, 34, American reality television personality (Road Rules, The Challenge), complications from chronic substance abuse.
Juan Goytisolo, 86, Spanish essayist, poet and novelist.
Bennie Hofs, 70, Dutch footballer (Vitesse).
Patrick G. Johnston, 58, Northern Irish scientist and academic administrator, Vice-Chancellor of Queen's University, Belfast (2014–2017).
David Nicholls, 61, British jockey and horse trainer.
Babatunde Osotimehin, 68, Nigerian politician and civil servant, executive director of the United Nations Population Fund (since 2011).
Orlando Figuera, 22, Venezuelan young man, killed during the 2017 Venezuelan protests.
Thomas C. Perry, 76, American politician, Mayor of Akron, New York (1987–1991).
Washington Sixolo, 83, South African actor (Emzini Wezinsizwa, Shaka Zulu, Who Am I?).
Roger Smith, 84, American actor (77 Sunset Strip, Mister Roberts, Auntie Mame), complications from Parkinson's disease.
Ravi Subramanian, 51, Indian cricket umpire.
Jack Trout, 82, American marketer and author, intestinal cancer.
*Zhang Tianfu, 106, Chinese agronomist and tea expert.

5
Annette Barbier, 66, American artist, complications from a bone marrow disorder.
Kathryn Stripling Byer, 72, American poet, North Carolina Poet Laureate (2005–2009), lymphoma.
Marco Coll, 81, Colombian footballer (América de Cali).
Andy Cunningham, 67, British magician, puppeteer and actor (Bodger & Badger), cancer.
Helen Dunmore, 64, British poet and writer (Zennor in Darkness), cancer.
Victor Gold, 88, American journalist and White House press secretary.
Marilyn Hall, 90, Canadian-born American television producer (A Woman Called Golda).
Anna Jókai, 84, Hungarian writer.
William Krisel, 92, Chinese-born American architect.
Georgios Masadis, 72, Greek footballer (Veria F.C.).
Rita Riggs, 86, American costume designer (Psycho, All in the Family, The Birds).
Giuliano Sarti, 83, Italian footballer (Fiorentina, Inter).
N. S. Ramanuja Tatacharya, 90, Indian academic.
Jimmy Thomas, 69, American football player (San Francisco 49ers).
Cheick Tioté, 30, Ivorian footballer (Twente, Newcastle United, national team), heart attack.
Ted Topor, 87, American football player (Detroit Lions).
James Vance, 64, American comic book writer (Kings in Disguise, Omaha the Cat Dancer, The Crow), cancer.
Héctor Wagner, 48, Dominican baseball player (Kansas City Royals), stomach cancer.

6
John Bower, 87, American Nordic combined skier.
Horace Burrell, 67, Jamaican soccer executive, President of the Jamaica Football Federation (since 2007), cancer.
Jean-Jacques Delvaux, 74, French politician, cancer.
Ainslie Embree, 96, American historian.
Andrew Francis, 70, Pakistani Roman Catholic prelate, Bishop of Multan (1999–2014).
Vin Garbutt, 69, British folk singer (When the Tide Turns, Bandalised, Word of Mouth), complications from heart surgery.
Tony Grubb, 80, English golfer.
Ragnhild Queseth Haarstad, 78, Norwegian politician.
François Houtart, 92, Belgian theologian.
Adnan Khashoggi, 81, Saudi arms dealer.
Davey Lambert, 48, English motorcycle racer, injuries sustained in crash.
Georgie Leahy, 78, Irish hurling coach (Kilkenny).
Earl Lestz, 78, American studio executive (Paramount Pictures), heart attack.
Bruce McMaster-Smith, 77, Australian football player.
Walter Noll, 92, German-born American mathematician.
Peter Norburn, 86, English rugby league footballer.
Latifur Rahman, 81, Bangladeshi justice, Chief Justice (2000–2001) and Chief Adviser (2001).
Sandra Reemer, 66, Dutch singer ("Als het om de liefde gaat", "Colorado", "The Party's Over"), breast cancer.
Márta Rudas, 80, Hungarian javelin thrower, Olympic silver medalist (1964).
Era Sezhiyan, 94, Indian writer and politician.
Keiichi Tahara, 65, Japanese photographer.
Bill Walker, 88, Scottish politician, MP for Perth and East Perthshire (1979–1983) and North Tayside (1983–1997).
Rokas Žilinskas, 44, Lithuanian journalist and politician, pneumonia.
Paul Zukofsky, 73, American violinist and conductor, non-Hodgkin lymphoma.

7
Angela Hartley Brodie, 82, British cancer researcher.
Irene Brown, 98, British author and codebreaker.
Arthur Bunting, 80, English rugby league player and coach (Hull Kingston Rovers, Hull F.C.).
Ernie Edds, 91, English footballer (Plymouth Argyle, Torquay United).
Cyril Frankel, 95, British film director (Make Me an Offer, On the Fiddle, The Witches).
Michael Francis Gibson, 87, Belgian-born French art critic and writer.
James Hardy, 31, American football player (Buffalo Bills, Baltimore Ravens), suicide by drowning. (body discovered on this date)
Jan Høiland, 78, Norwegian singer.
Holy Bull, 26, American Thoroughbred racehorse, 1994 American Horse of the Year, euthanized.
Robert S. Leiken, 78, American political scientist and historian.
Trento Longaretti, 100, Italian painter.
Françoise Mailliard, 87, French Olympic fencer (1960).
Charles-Eugène Marin, 91, Canadian politician, MP (1984–1993).
Tom Poole, 81, British barrister.
Eero Rislakki, 92, Finnish industrial engineer.
France Rode, 82, Slovenian engineer, inventor of the scientific pocket calculator.
Deo Rwabiita, 74, Ugandan politician and diplomat.
Patsy Terrell, 55, American politician, member of the Kansas House of Representatives (since 2017).
Ed Victor, 77, American-born British literary agent, heart attack.
Thierry Zéno, 67, Belgian writer and filmmaker, cancer.

8
Miguel d'Escoto Brockmann, 84, Nicaraguan diplomat, politician and priest, Foreign Minister of Nicaragua (1979–1990) and President of the United Nations General Assembly (2008–2009).
Fred Fiedler, 95, Austrian-born American psychologist.
LeRoy Fjordbotten, 78, Canadian politician, MLA of Alberta (1979–1993).
Ervin A. Gonzalez, 57, American attorney, suicide.
Marcelo Guinle, 69, Argentine politician, Senator from Chubut Province (2001–2015).
Václav Halama, 76, Czech football player and coach.
Glenne Headly, 62, American actress (Dirty Rotten Scoundrels, Mr. Holland's Opus, Dick Tracy), complications from pulmonary embolism.
Naseem Khan, 77, British journalist (Time Out, The Guardian).
Sergo Kutivadze, 72, Georgian football player and coach (FC Dinamo Tbilisi, Torpedo Kutaisi).
Robert Melson, 46, American murderer, executed by lethal injection.
René Monse, 48, German Olympic heavyweight boxer (1996).
Jan Notermans, 84, Dutch footballer (Fortuna Sittard, national team).
Sam Panopoulos, 82, Greek-born Canadian cook, inventor of the Hawaiian pizza.
Jill Singer, 60, Australian journalist (ABC, Seven, Herald Sun), AL amyloidosis.
Sir Bernard Tomlinson, 96, English neuropathologist.
Norro Wilson, 79, American country music songwriter ("A Very Special Love Song", "The Most Beautiful Girl") and record producer, Grammy winner (1975), heart failure.
Prince Udaya Priyantha, 48, Sri Lankan artist and singer, complications from a brain infection.

9
Gazi Shahabuddin Ahmed, 78, Bangladeshi journalist, cancer.
Natig Aliyev, 69, Azerbaijani politician, Minister of Energy (since 2004), complications from a heart attack.
Andrzej Baturo, 77, Polish photographer.
Edit DeAk, 68, Hungarian-born American art critic and writer, pneumonia and respiratory stress syndrome.
Vic Edelbrock Jr., 80, American automotive products manufacturer (Edelbrock).
Patricia Goldsmith, 88, English artist.
John Heyman, 84, British-American producer (D.A.R.Y.L.).
Romualda Hofertienė, 75, Lithuanian politician.
Lady Mary Holborow, 80, British magistrate, Lord Lieutenant of Cornwall (1994–2011).
Ewald Janusz, 76, Polish Olympic sprint canoer (1968).
Frank A. Jenssen, 65, Norwegian writer and photographer.
S. S. Khaplang, 77, Burmese politician.
John Liu Shi-gong, 88, Chinese clandestine Roman Catholic prelate, Bishop of Jining (since 1995).
Palvai Govardhan Reddy, 80, Indian politician, heart attack.
Grace Berg Schaible, 91, American lawyer and politician, Alaska Attorney General (1987–1989).
Andimba Toivo ya Toivo, 92, Namibian anti-apartheid activist, politician and political prisoner (SWAPO).
García Verdugo, 83, Spanish football player (Xerez CD, Real Valladolid) and manager (CD Tenerife, CA Osasuna).
Adam West, 88, American actor (Batman, Family Guy, Robinson Crusoe on Mars), leukemia.
Sheila Willcox, 81, British equestrian, European champion (1957).
John C. Yoder, 66, American judge and politician, member of the West Virginia Senate (1992–1996, 2004–2008), complications of heart surgery.

10
Abu Khattab al-Tunisi, Tunisian jihadist, shot.
Ray J. Ceresa, 83, British philatelist.
Chi Po-lin, 52, Taiwanese aerial photographer and director (Beyond Beauty: Taiwan from Above), helicopter crash.
Alexander M. Cruickshank, 97, American chemist.
Austin Deasy, 80, Irish politician, TD (1977–2002) and Minister of Agriculture (1982–1987).
Helen Freedhoff, 77, Canadian theoretical physicist.
Peter Hocken, 84, British theologian and historian.
John R. Holman, 67, British philatelist.
Herma Hill Kay, 82, American legal scholar.
Malang, 89, Filipino cartoonist, illustrator and painter.
Oscar Mammì, 90, Italian politician, Minister of Mail and Telecommunications (1987–1991).
Mihai Nedef, 85, Romanian Olympic basketball player (1952).
Jerry Nelson, 73, American astronomer.
Julia Perez, 36, Indonesian actress, cervical cancer.
Samuel V. Wilson, 93, American army lieutenant general, Director of the Defense Intelligence Agency (1976–1977).

11
Alan Campbell, 67, Northern Irish Pentecostal pastor and author.
Errol Christie, 53, British boxer, lung cancer.
Herman T. Costello, 96, American politician, member of the New Jersey General Assembly (1976–1982) and Senate (1982–1984).
Alice Dewey, 89, American anthropologist.
John Friedmann, 91, Austrian-born American academic.
David Fromkin, 84, American historian.
Jim Graham, 71, American politician, member of the Council of the District of Columbia (1999–2015), complications from an infection.
Nigel Grainge, 70, British music industry executive (Ensign Records).
Alexandra Kluge, 80, German actress and physician.
Lois McIvor, 86, New Zealand artist.
Norman Pollack, 84, American historian, cancer.
S. R. Ramchandra Rao, 85, Indian cricket umpire.
Ragnar Rommetveit, 92, Norwegian psychologist.
Geoffrey Rowell, 74, British Anglican prelate, Bishop of Basingstoke (1994–2001) and Europe (2001–2013).
Clive Rushton, 69, British Olympic swimmer (1972) and swimming coach, cancer.
Elaine Schreiber, 78, Australian Paralympic athlete.
Rosalie Sorrels, 83, American folk singer.
Corneliu Stroe, 67, Romanian drummer and percussionist, heart attack.

12
Teresa Albuquerque, 87, Indian historian.
Piotr Andrejew, 69, Polish film director (Shadow Man).
Myron Atkinson, 89, American politician, member of the North Dakota House of Representatives (1969–1976).
Sam Beazley, 101, British actor (Harry Potter and the Order of the Phoenix, Johnny English, Pride and Prejudice).
Brian Bellhouse, 80, British academic, engineer and entrepreneur, trampled.
Theodor Bergmann, 101, German agronomist.
Joan Bicknell, 78, English psychiatrist.
Marike Bok, 74, Dutch portrait painter.
Robert Campeau, 93, Canadian financier and real estate developer.
Vinod Chohan, 68, Tanzanian particle accelerator specialist and engineer.
Morton N. Cohen, 96, American author and scholar.
Clifford John Earle Jr., 81, American mathematician.
David W. Frank, 67, American actor, author and educator, complications from cancer.
Jim Galton, 92, American businessman, CEO of Marvel Entertainment Group.
Philip Gossett, 75, American musicologist.
Gheorghe Gușet, 49, Romanian shot putter, competed in 1992, 2000, and 2004 Olympics, aortic dissection.
Jagjeet Singh Kular, 75, Kenyan Olympic hockey player (1972).
*Fernando Martínez Heredia, 78, Cuban revolutionary and politician.
Masahide Ōta, 92, Japanese historian and politician, Governor of Okinawa Prefecture (1990–1998), pneumonia and respiratory failure.
Frank Pecora, 86, American politician, member of the Pennsylvania Senate for the 44th District (1979–1994).
Pessalli, 26, Brazilian footballer (Grêmio, Angers, Paraná), traffic collision.
C. Narayana Reddy, 85, Indian writer and poet, recipient of the Jnanpith Award (1988).
Frans Ronnes, 68, Dutch politician, Mayor of Haaren (2001–2013).
David Shentow, 92, Belgian-born Canadian Holocaust survivor.
Marvin Herman Shoob, 94, American federal judge, U.S. District Court for the Northern District of Georgia (1979–1991).
Brian Taylor, 84, English cricketer (Essex).
Charles P. Thacker, 74, American computer designer, co-inventor of Ethernet, complications from esophageal cancer.
Karl-Heinz Weigang, 81, German football coach, heart attack.
Donald Winch, 82, British economist and academic.

13
Jeffrey Arenburg, 60, Canadian killer, heart attack.
Richard Farson, 90, American behavioral psychologist, author, and educator.
A. R. Gurney, 86, American playwright (The Dining Room, Love Letters).
Hansel, 29, American racehorse, winner of the 1991 Preakness Stakes and Belmont Stakes, euthanized.
Richard Long, 4th Viscount Long, 88, British politician and aristocrat.
Patricia Knatchbull, 2nd Countess Mountbatten of Burma, 93, British peeress.
Lee Murchison, 79, American football player (San Francisco 49ers, Dallas Cowboys), complications from a fall.
Yōko Nogiwa, 81, Japanese actress (Yakuza Deka, Key Hunter, Minna no Ie).
José Odon Maia Alencar, 88, Brazilian politician, Governor of Piauí (1966), Mayor of Pio IX (1959–1962).
Jack Ong, 76, American actor (Next, Leprechaun in the Hood, General Hospital), brain tumor.
Ootje Oxenaar, 87, Dutch graphic artist and banknote designer.
Anita Pallenberg, 75, Italian actress (Barbarella, Performance, A Degree of Murder), hepatitis.
Pierre Papillaud, 81, French businessman.
Zahir Shah, 70, Pakistani actor.
Ulf Stark, 72, Swedish author (Can You Whistle, Johanna?), cancer.
Rick Tuten, 52, American football player (Seattle Seahawks).

14
Raziel Abelson, 95, American philosopher.
Luis Abanto Morales, 93, Peruvian singer and composer.
June Blum, 87, American artist.
Fred Cogley, 82, Irish sports broadcaster.
Lynn Conkwright, 63, American bodybuilder.
Jacques Foix, 86, French footballer.
Ann Louise Gilligan, 71, Irish feminist theologian, complications from a brain haemorrhage.
Rob Gonsalves, 57, Canadian painter and illustrator.
Ernestina Herrera de Noble, 92, Argentine newspaper publisher (Clarín).
Arthur J. Jackson, 92, American military officer, Medal of Honor recipient.
Kuriakose Kunnacherry, 88, Indian Syro-Malabar hierarch, Archbishop of Kottayam (1974–2006).
Don Matthews, 77, American-Canadian football coach (BC Lions, Toronto Argonauts, Edmonton Eskimos), cancer.
Khadija Saye, 24, British photographer, injuries sustained in the Grenfell Tower fire.
Hein Verbruggen, 75, Dutch sports administrator, President of the UCI (1991–2005), leukemia.

15
Ibrahim Abouleish, 80, Egyptian pharmacologist and biodynamic agriculturalist (SEKEM).
Martin Aitken, 95, British archaeometrist.
David L. Armstrong, 75, American politician, Mayor of Louisville (1999–2003).
Ajmer Singh Aulakh, 74, Indian playwright, cancer.
Aleksey Batalov, 88, Russian actor (The Cranes Are Flying, The Lady with the Dog, Moscow Does Not Believe in Tears), complications from a fall.
P. N. Bhagwati, 95, Indian judge, Chief Justice (1985–1986), acting Governor of Gujarat (1967, 1973).
Jacques Charpentier, 83, French composer and organist.
John Dalmas, 90, American science fiction writer, pneumonia.
Bill Dana, 92, American comedian, actor and screenwriter (The Bill Dana Show, The Ed Sullivan Show, The Nude Bomb).
Wilma de Faria, 72, Brazilian politician, Governor of Rio Grande do Norte (2003–2010), cancer.
Evelyn Freeman Roberts, 98, American musician, songwriter and educator.
Kyla Greenbaum, 95, British pianist.
Stina Haage, 92, Swedish Olympic gymnast (1948).
Larry Hayes, 81, American football player (Los Angeles Rams).
Jim Hendrick, 82, American sports announcer.
Phyllis A. Kravitch, 96, American judge, U.S. Court of Appeals for the Fifth Circuit (1979–1981) and Eleventh Circuit (1981–1996).
Barbara Kulaszka, 64, Canadian lawyer, lung cancer.
Kalamandalam Leelamma, 65, Indian classical dancer.
James W. McCord Jr., 93, American intelligence officer, pancreatic cancer.
Dame Ngāneko Minhinnick, 77, New Zealand Māori leader (Ngāti Te Ata).
Rumen Nenov, 47, Bulgarian footballer.
Harry Prime, 97, American big band singer.
Danny Schock, 68, Canadian ice hockey player (Boston Bruins, Philadelphia Flyers).
Olbram Zoubek, 91, Czech sculptor.

16
John G. Avildsen, 81, American film director (Rocky, The Karate Kid, Save the Tiger), Oscar winner (1977), pancreatic cancer.
Christian Cabrol, 91, French cardiac surgeon and politician, MEP (1994–1999).
Héctor Cardona, 81, Puerto Rican sports executive, president of Puerto Rico Olympic Committee (1991–2008), executive vice-president of International Amateur Boxing Association, cancer.
Eliza Clívia, 37, Brazilian singer, traffic collision.
Jim French, 84, American photographer
Luciano Frosini, 89, Italian racing cyclist.
Stephen Furst, 63, American actor (Babylon 5, Animal House, St. Elsewhere), complications from diabetes.
Leon Garror, 69, American football player (Buffalo Bills).
Curt Hanson, 73, American politician, member of the Iowa House of Representatives (since 2009), cancer.
Mieczysław Kalenik, 84, Polish stage and film actor (Krzyżacy).
Edzai Kasinauyo, 42, Zimbabwean footballer (CAPS United, Moroka Swallows).
Helmut Kohl, 87, German politician, Chancellor (1982–1998), Minister-President of Rhineland-Palatinate (1969–1976).
Maurice Mességué, 95, French herbalist.
Ren Rong, 99, Chinese politician, Communist Party Chief of Tibet Autonomous Region (1971–1980).
Günter Siebert, 86, German football player and executive, West German Champion (1958) and chairman (Schalke).
Hans Olav Tungesvik, 81, Norwegian politician, MP (1977–1985), traffic collision.
Dick Warner, 70, Irish journalist (RTÉ) and environmentalist.

17
Rodolfo Fontiveros Beltran, 68, Filipino Roman Catholic prelate, Vicar Apostolic of Bontoc-Lagawe (2006–2012) and Bishop of San Fernando de La Union (since 2012).
Elias Burstein, 99, American physicist.
Ken Campbell, 89, Australian paleontologist.
Gailanne Cariddi, 63, American politician, member of the Massachusetts House of Representatives (since 2011).
Diana Cavallo, 85, American author.
Iván Fandiño, 36, Spanish bullfighter, gored.
Larry Grantham, 78, American football player (New York Jets).
Józef Grudzień, 78, Polish lightweight boxer, Olympic champion (1964) and silver medalist (1968).
Pierre Imhasly, 77, Swiss author and poet, cancer.
Henk van Rossum, 97, Dutch politician, member of the House of Representatives (1967–1986).
Baldwin Lonsdale, 68, ni-Vanuatu politician, President (since 2014), heart attack.
Luis Lusquiños, 65, Argentine politician, member of the Chamber of Deputies (2005–2009), Chief of the Cabinet of Ministers (2001).
William S. Massey, 96, American mathematician.
Thara Memory, 68, American jazz trumpeter, Grammy winner (2013).
Omar Monza, 88, Argentine Olympic basketball player (1952), world champion (1950).
Frederick P. Nickles, 69, American politician.
Venus Ramey, 92, American beauty pageant contestant (Miss America 1944) and gun rights activist.
Leopoldo S. Tumulak, 72, Filipino Roman Catholic prelate, Bishop of Tagbilaran (1992–2005) and Military Ordinary of the Philippines (since 2005), pancreatic cancer.
Anneliese Uhlig, 98, German actress (Don Cesare di Bazan).
Emil Wojtaszek, 89, Polish politician, Minister of Foreign Affairs (1976–1980).

18
Atmasthananda, 98, Indian Hindu leader, president of Ramakrishna Math (since 2007).
Octavio Betancourt Arango, 89, Colombian Roman Catholic prelate, Bishop of Garzón (1975–1977).
Hans Breder, 81, German-born American artist, complications of ischemic colitis.
Pierluigi Chicca, 79, Italian fencer, Olympic silver (1964, 1968) and bronze medalist (1960).
Keith Farnham, 69, American politician, member of the Illinois House of Representatives (2009–2014).
Albert Franks, 81, English footballer (Newcastle United, Rangers, Greenock Morton).
Roger Greenspun, 87, American journalist and film critic.
Tim Hague, 34, Canadian mixed martial artist (UFC, WSOF, KOTC), brain hemorrhage.
John Wesley Hardt, 95, American Methodist prelate and author.
Joel Joffe, Baron Joffe, 85, South African-born British human rights lawyer and life peer.
Predhiman Krishan Kaw, 69, Indian plasma physicist, heart disease.
Joyce Lindores, 73, Scottish bowler, Commonwealth Games gold medalist (1988).
Tony Liscio, 76, American football player (Dallas Cowboys), amyotrophic lateral sclerosis.
Antonio Medellín, 75, Mexican actor (Tres veces Ana, Porque el amor manda, Cuando me enamoro).
Chris Murrell, 61, American jazz singer.
Simon Nelson, 85, American mass murderer.
*Shih Chun-jen, 93, Taiwanese neurosurgeon and politician, Minister of the Department of Health (1986–1990), heart attack.
Ola Skarholt, 77, Norwegian orienteering runner, world champion (1970).
Shirley Walters, 91, Australian politician, Senator for Tasmania (1975–1993).

19
Wivianne Bergh, 78, Swedish Olympic discus thrower (1960).
Brian Cant, 83, British actor (Dappledown Farm) and television presenter (Play School), complications of Parkinson's disease.
Ron Crane, 67, American electrical engineer, cancer.
Ivan Dias, 81, Indian Roman Catholic cardinal, Archbishop of Bombay (1996–2006) and Prefect of the Congregation for the Evangelization of Peoples (2006–2011).
Tony DiCicco, 68, American soccer coach (women's national team), Olympic champion (1996) and 1999 World Cup winner.
Tabaré Hackenbruch, 88, Uruguayan politician, MP (1967–1973) and Mayor of Canelones (1985–1989, 1995–2005).
Carla Fendi, 79, Italian fashion executive (Fendi).
Sir Brian Kenny, 83, British army general, Deputy Supreme Allied Commander Europe (1990–1993).
Hedwig Leenaert, 85, Belgian Olympic athlete.
Ilse Pagé, 78, German actress (Berlin, Schoenhauser Corner).
Amrit Pal, 76, Indian actor, cirrhosis.
Zoltan Sarosy, 110, Hungarian-born Canadian chess master.
Annikki Tähti, 87, Finnish schlager singer.
Otto Warmbier, 22, American college student, convicted of theft and imprisoned by North Korea.

20
Roger D. Abrahams, 84, American folklorist.
Herbert H. Ágústsson, 90, Austrian-born Icelandic composer and musician.
Ali Audah, 92, Indonesian author.
James Berry, 93, Jamaican-born British poet, Alzheimer's disease.
Mervyn Crossman, 82, Australian field hockey player, Olympic bronze medalist (1964).
Bob A. Johnson, 71, American politician.
Frode Larsen, 68, Norwegian footballer (SK Brann, national team).
Sergei Mylnikov, 58, Russian ice hockey player (Traktor Chelyabinsk, Quebec Nordiques), Olympic champion (1988).
John Perry, 97, English Anglican priest, Archdeacon of Middlesex (1975–1982).
Prodigy, 42, American rapper, accidental choking.
R. D. Reid, 72, Canadian actor (Nero Wolfe, Dawn of the Dead, Capote).
Héctor Ríos Ereñú, 86, Argentine military officer, Chief of Defense Staff (1983–1987).
William Schull, 95, American geneticist.
Fredrik Skagen, 80, Norwegian writer.

21
Gurmit Singh Aulakh, 79, Pakistani research scientist and political activist.
Philip Coppens, 86, Dutch-born American chemist and crystallographer.
Yuri Drozdov, 91, Russian spymaster.
Kelechi Emeteole, 66, Nigerian footballer (national team), throat cancer.
John Faull, 83, Welsh rugby union player (Swansea, British Lions).
Leroy Jenkins, 83, American televangelist.
Jean-Pierre Kahane, 90, French mathematician.
Pompeyo Márquez, 95, Venezuelan politician and guerrilla, founder of the Movement for Socialism party and Minister of Borders (1994–1999).
Steffi Martin, 54, German luger, Olympic (1984, 1988) and world champion (1983, 1985), cancer.
Udit Narayan, 57, Fijian politician.
Ludger Rémy, 68, German harpsichordist and conductor.
Belton Richard, 77, American singer and Cajun accordionist, pneumonia.
György Rubovszky, 73, Hungarian lawyer and politician, MP (1994–2002, since 2003).
Con Sciacca, 70, Italian-born Australian politician, MP for Bowman (1987–1996, 1998–2004), Minister for Veterans' Affairs (1994–1996), cancer.
Robert M. Shoemaker, 93, American military officer, commander of FORSCOM (1977–1982).
Ray Smith, 88, English footballer (Southend United F.C.).
Alexandre Sowa, 90, French cyclist.
Brian Street, 73, British anthropologist.
Ila Teromaa, 63, Finnish motorcycle speedway rider, complications from surgery.
Gordon Voss, 79, American politician, member of the Minnesota House of Representatives (1973–1989), traffic collision.
Howard Witt, 85, American actor (Death of a Salesman).

22
Norman Ayrton, 92, British actor, director and theatre instructor.
Richard Benson, 73, American photographer, heart failure.
Vincent Cooke, 81, American Jesuit and academic administrator, President of Canisius College (1993–2010), cancer.
Pavel Dalaloyan, 38, Russian footballer, traffic collision.
Paul De Rolf, 74, American actor (The Ten Commandments, The Beverly Hillbillies) and choreographer (1941), Alzheimer's disease.
Hervé Filion, 77, Canadian Hall of Fame harness racing driver, complications from COPD.
Gunter Gabriel, 75, German singer, musician and composer, fall.
Kevin Gatter, 65, English pathologist.
Necmettin Karaduman, 90, Turkish politician.
Des Hanafin, 86, Irish politician, member of Seanad Éireann (1965–2002).
Carroll N. Jones III, 72, American artist.
Mao Kobayashi, 34, Japanese actress and television presenter (NTV), breast cancer.
Frank Kush, 88, American Hall of Fame football player and coach (Arizona State).
Keith Loneker, 46, American football player (Los Angeles Rams) and actor (Out of Sight, Superbad), cancer.
Quett Masire, 91, Botswanan politician, President (1980–1998), complications from surgery.
Sheila Michaels, 78, American writer and activist, popularizer of term Ms., leukemia.
Bogoljub Mitić Đoša, 49, Serbian comedian and actor, heart attack.
Jimmy Nalls, 66, American rock guitarist (Sea Level), fall.
Hartmut Neugebauer, 74, German actor (Charley's Nieces, Derrick).
John R. Quinn, 88, American Roman Catholic prelate, Archbishop of San Francisco (1977–1995).
Bob Ring, 70, American ice hockey player (Boston Bruins).
John E. Sarno, 93, American physician and writer.
Philip F. Smith, 84, American Coast Guard officer.
Sandy Tatum, 96, American sports administrator, president of the USGA (1978–1980).
Robert F. Tinker, 75, American physicist and educationalist.
Yevhen Vansovych, 86, Ukrainian Olympian.
Stewart Wieck, 49, American game designer (White Wolf Publishing).
Nikolai Zhugan, 100, Ukrainian-born Russian pilot, Hero of the Soviet Union (1944).

23
John Freeman, 83, Welsh rugby player (Halifax R.L.F.C.).
Ant Gyi, 94, Burmese singer.
Saman Kelegama, 58, Sri Lankan economist, stroke.
Betty Metcalf, 95, American politician, member of the Florida House of Representatives (1982–1988), vascular dementia.
Mr. Pogo, 66, Japanese professional wrestler (FMW, CSW, W*ING), cerebral infarction during back surgery.
Gabe Pressman, 93, American journalist (WNBC).
Stefano Rodotà, 84, Italian jurist and politician, Vice President of the Chamber of Deputies (1992).
Lucy Seki, 78, Brazilian linguist.
Laird Sloan, 81, Canadian Olympic sprinter.
*Tonny van der Linden, 84, Dutch footballer (VV DOS, national team).

24
Andrey Dvinyaninov, 31, Russian sledge hockey player, Paralympic silver medalist (2014).
Paul Fitzgerald, 94, Australian painter.
Amir Hassanpour, 73, Iranian-born Canadian academic.
Loren Janes, 85, American stuntman (Back to the Future, Hook, The Abyss), Alzheimer's disease.
Mats Johansson, 65, Swedish journalist and politician, MP (2006–2014).
Nick Kirk, 59, New Zealand priest, motor neuron disease.
Tom Kremer, 87, Romanian-born British game designer and publisher.
Parker Lee McDonald, 93, American jurist, Chief Justice of the Supreme Court of Florida (1979–1994).
Maria Mutagamba, 64, Ugandan economist and politician, Minister of Tourism (2012–2016), liver cancer.
Nils Nilsson, 81, Swedish ice hockey player (national team), Olympic silver medalist (1964).
Monica Nordquist, 76, Swedish actress (Du är inte klok, Madicken).
Tomasi Rabaka, 51, Fijian rugby union player.
Véronique Robert, 54, French-Swiss journalist, injuries sustained in explosion.
Anand Pal Singh, 40, Indian gangster, shot.
Martin J. Steinbach, 75, Canadian ophthalmologist.
Alberto Zerain, 55, Spanish mountaineer, avalanche.
Meir Zlotowitz, 73, American rabbi and publisher (ArtScroll).

25
Elsa Daniel, 80, Argentine film actress (The Grandfather, The House of the Angel, La mano en la trampa).
Agha Shahbaz Khan Durrani, Pakistani politician, Senator (since 2015), heart attack.
Dave Evans, 66, American bluegrass musician.
Olga Feliú, 84, Chilean lawyer, academic and politician, Senator (1990–1998).
Walter Fillmore, 84, American marines brigadier general.
Hal Fryar, 90, American actor and TV show host (The Three Stooges), bladder cancer.
Harry Gorringe, 89, Australian cricketer (Western Australia).
Skip Homeier, 86, American actor (Tomorrow, the World!, Boys' Ranch, Star Trek), spinal myelopathy.
Sunil Lal Joshi, 51, Nepalese Olympic weightlifter (1996), heart attack.
Lorna McDonald, 100, Australian historian and author.
Denis McQuail, 82, British communication theorist.
K. R. Mohanan, 69, Indian film director (Swaroopam), stomach illness.
Félix Mourinho, 79, Portuguese football player and manager (Vitória Setúbal, Rio Ave).
Meir Nimni, 68, Israeli Olympic footballer.
Robert Overend, 86, Northern Irish farmer and politician.
Sir Richard Paniguian, 67, British civil servant and industrialist.
Alain Senderens, 77, French chef.
Gordon Wilson, 79, Scottish politician, leader of the Scottish National Party (1979–1990), MP (1974–1987).
Eduard Zeman, 69, Czech politician, Minister of Education, Youth and Sports (1998–2002).

26
David Bleakley, 92, Northern Irish politician, MP (1958–1965).
Jimmy Chi, 69, Australian playwright and composer (Bran Nue Dae).
Jean Delahaye, 87, French cyclist.
Claude Fagedet, 89, French photographer.
Desh Bandhu Gupta, 79, Indian billionaire businessman, founder of Lupin Limited.
Janet Lunn, 88, American-born Canadian children's writer (The Root Cellar, The Hollow Tree).
Rex Makin, 91, British solicitor, coined the term "Beatlemania".
Sir Duncan McMullin, 90, New Zealand jurist.
Guy Ngan, 91, New Zealand artist.
Doug Peterson, 71, American yacht designer, cancer.
Isaías Pimentel, 84, Venezuelan tennis player.
Habib Thiam, 84, Senegalese politician, Prime Minister (1981–1983, 1991–1998).
Alice Trolle-Wachtmeister, 91, Swedish countess, Chief Court Mistress (1994-2015).

27
Bridget Allchin, 90, British archaeologist.
Geri Allen, 60, American jazz pianist, composer and educator, cancer.
Dušan T. Bataković, 60, Serbian historian and diplomat.
Peter L. Berger, 88, American sociologist (Boston University).
Better Talk Now, 18, American racehorse, winner of the 2004 Breeders' Cup Turf, euthanized.
Piotr Bikont, 62, Polish journalist, publicist, culinary critic, and theatre director, traffic collision.
Michael Bond, 91, British children's author (Paddington Bear).
Jacinta Coleman, 42, New Zealand Olympic cyclist (2000), bowel cancer.
Pierre Combescot, 77, French journalist and writer.
Tom Corcoran, 85, American Olympic alpine skier (1956, 1960).
Sudhin Das, 87, Bangladeshi Nazrul Sangeet musician.
Mary Blagg Huey, 95, American educator, president of Texas Woman's University (1976–1986).
Rae Desmond Jones, 75, Australian poet, novelist and politician.
Paolo Limiti, 77, Italian journalist, television/radio writer/presenter and songwriter ("Silent Voices"), brain cancer.
João Oneres Marchiori, 84, Brazilian Roman Catholic prelate, Bishop of Caçador (1977–1983) and Lages (1987–2009).
Michael Nyqvist, 56, Swedish actor (The Girl with the Dragon Tattoo, Mission: Impossible – Ghost Protocol, John Wick), lung cancer.
Stéphane Paille, 52, French football player and manager (Sochaux, national team).
Fernando Picó, 75, Puerto Rican academic, historian and Jesuit priest, specialist on the history of Puerto Rico.
Valentín Pimstein, 91, Chilean television producer (María la del Barrio, Marimar, Carrusel), respiratory arrest.
Maksym Shapoval, 38, Ukrainian chief intelligence officer, car bomb.
Ric Suggitt, 58, Canadian rugby union coach (national team).
Suh Yun-bok, 94, South Korean Olympic athlete (1948), winner of the Boston Marathon (1947).
Mustafa Tlass, 85, Syrian military officer and politician, Minister of Defense (1972–2004).
Roger Toulson, Lord Toulson, 70, British lawyer and Supreme Court judge.
Toytown, 24, British eventing horse.
Anthony Young, 51, American baseball player (New York Mets, Chicago Cubs, Houston Astros), brain cancer.

28
Russ Adams, 86, American tennis photographer.
Robert Bockstael, 94, Canadian politician.
Peter Paul Busuttil, 73, Maltese politician, Mayor of Hal Safi (1994-2012) and involved in Raymond Caruana murder.
Phil Cohran, 90, American jazz trumpeter.
Christopher Colclough, 70, English economist.
Michael Lindsay Coulton Crawford, 100, British submariner.
C. O. Erickson, 93, American producer and production manager (Rear Window, Chinatown, Blade Runner), heart complications.
John Higgins, 87, Scottish footballer (Hibernian), Alzheimer's disease.
Nazmul Huda Bachchu, 78, Bangladeshi actor.
Shinji Mori, 42, Japanese baseball player and coach, sepsis.
Bernard Nottage, 71, Bahamian politician and Olympic sprinter (1968).
Wally O'Connell, 94, Australian rugby league footballer and coach (Eastern Suburbs, Manly-Warringah).
Ola Mildred Rexroat, 99, American Airforce Service pilot during World War II.
Bruce Stewart, 80, New Zealand author and playwright.
Danbaba Suntai, 55, Nigerian politician, Governor of Taraba State (2007–2012), brain injury.

29
Ai Mingzhi, 92, Chinese writer.
James Davidson, 90, British politician, MP for West Aberdeenshire (1966–1970).
Aline Hanson, 67, Saint Martin politician, cancer.
Ken Hopper, 93, Australian football player (Hawthorn).
Carl W. Kroening, 89, American politician.
Miriam Marx, 90, American author.
John Monckton, 78, Australian swimmer, Olympic silver medalist (1956) and Commonwealth Games champion (1958).
Louis Nicollin, 74, French entrepreneur, Chairman of Montpellier Hérault Sport Club (since 1974), heart attack.
Pan Qingfu, Chinese martial artist.
Chuck Renslow, 87, American businessman and LGBT activist.
Marrion Roe, 82, New Zealand Olympic swimmer (1956).
Antonio Sagona, 61, Australian archaeologist.
William Sanders, 75, American author and editor (Helix SF).
Dave Semenko, 59, Canadian ice hockey player and scout (Edmonton Oilers), liver and pancreatic cancer.
Achille Tramarin, 70, Italian politician.
Suna Venter, 32, South African journalist and radio producer (SABC), heart failure.
Michael Vickery, 86, American historian.

30
Ramiro Alejandro Celis, 25, Mexican bullfighter, gored.
Minaketan Das, 56, Indian actor, pancreatic cancer.
Karunamaya Goswami, 74, Bangladeshi musicologist.
Mitchell Henry, 24, American football player (Denver Broncos, Green Bay Packers, Baltimore Ravens), leukemia.
Colin Hughes, 87, Bahamian-born Australian political scientist.
Darrall Imhoff, 78, American basketball player (New York Knicks, Los Angeles Lakers, Portland Trail Blazers), Olympic gold medalist (1960), heart attack.
Godfrey Gitahi Kariuki, 79, Kenyan politician, MP (2003–2007) and Senator (since 2013).
Bahadur Nariman Kavina, 80, Indian naval officer, commanding officer of the Nipat.
László Kovács, 66, Hungarian football player (Videoton, ETO, national team) and coach.
Barry Norman, 83, British film critic and television presenter (Film...).
Max Runager, 61, American football player (Philadelphia Eagles, San Francisco 49ers).
Ramon Schwartz Jr., 92, American politician.
Jake Tordesillas, 68, Filipino screenwriter (Bagets, Captain Barbell, Magpakailanman), complications from a fall.
Simone Veil, 89, French lawyer and politician, President of the European Parliament (1979–1982), Minister of Health (1974–1979, 1993–1995), and Holocaust survivor.

References

2017-06
 06